The 1906 All England Championships was a badminton tournament held at the London Rifle Brigade Drill Hall, London, England, from February 28 to March 3, 1906.

Ethel Thomson and Meriel Lucas won a fourth women's doubles crown and third consecutive after retaining their title. There were two mixed doubles handicap events due to the excessive number of entries.

Final results

Men's singles

Women's singles

Men's doubles

Women's doubles

Mixed doubles

References

All England Open Badminton Championships
All England
All England Open Badminton Championships in London
All England Championships
All England Badminton Championships
All England Badminton Championships